The 1975 Texas Longhorns baseball team represented the University of Texas in the 1975 NCAA Division I baseball season. The Longhorns played their home games at Disch-Falk Field. The team was coached by Cliff Gustafson in his 9th season at Texas.

The Longhorns won the College World Series, defeating the South Carolina Gamecocks in the championship game.

Roster

Schedule 

! style="background:#BF5700;color:white;"| Regular Season
|- valign="top" 

|- align="center" bgcolor="#ddffdd"
| February 17 ||  || Disch-Falk Field || 4-0 || 1-0 || –
|- align="center" bgcolor="#ddffdd"
| February 17 || St. Mary's || Disch-Falk Field || 11-0 || 2-0 || –
|- align="center" bgcolor="#ddffdd"
| February 21 ||  || Disch-Falk Field || 1-0 || 3-0 || –
|- align="center" bgcolor="#ddffdd"
| February 21 || Sam Houston State || Disch-Falk Field || 9-5 || 4-0 || –
|- align="center" bgcolor="#ffdddd"
| February 22 || Sam Houston State || Disch-Falk Field || 0-3 || 4-1 || –
|- align="center" bgcolor="#ffdddd"
| February 22 || Sam Houston State || Disch-Falk Field || 4-7 || 4-2 || –
|- align="center" bgcolor="#ddffdd"
| February 25 ||  || Disch-Falk Field || 12-3 || 5-2 || –
|- align="center" bgcolor="#ddffdd"
| February 25 || Texas Lutheran || Disch-Falk Field || 8-3 || 6-2 || –
|- align="center" bgcolor="ddffdd"
| February 28 || at  || Cougar Field || 8-7 || 7-2 || 1-0
|-

|- align="center" bgcolor="ddffdd"
| March 1 || at Houston || Cougar Field || 9-2 || 8-2 || 2-0
|- align="center" bgcolor="ddffdd"
| March 1 || at Houston || Cougar Field || 17-4 || 9-2 || 3-0
|- align="center" bgcolor="ddffdd"
| March 3 ||  || Disch-Falk Field || 8-3 || 10-2 || –
|- align="center" bgcolor="ddffdd"
| March 3 || Lubbock Christian || Disch-Falk Field || 17-2 || 11-2 || –
|- align="center" bgcolor="ddffdd"
| March 4 || Lubbock Christian || Disch-Falk Field || 9-2 || 12-2 || –
|- align="center" bgcolor="ddffdd"
| March 4 || Lubbock Christian || Disch-Falk Field || 12-3 || 13-2 || –
|- align="center" bgcolor="ddffdd"
| March 7 ||  || Disch-Falk Field || 9-1 || 14-2 || 4-0
|- align="center" bgcolor="ddffdd"
| March 8 || Rice || Disch-Falk Field || 3-0 || 15-2 || 5-0
|- align="center" bgcolor="ddffdd"
| March 8 || Rice || Disch-Falk Field || 9-1 || 16–2 || 6–0
|- align="center" bgcolor="ddffdd"
| March 14 ||  || Disch-Falk Field || 7-1 || 17-2 || 7-0
|- align="center" bgcolor="ddffdd"
| March 15 || Texas Tech || Disch-Falk Field || 7-1 || 18-2 || 8-0
|- align="center" bgcolor="ddffdd"
| March 15 || Texas Tech || Disch-Falk Field || 14-1 || 19-2 || 9-0
|- align="center" bgcolor="#ffdddd"
| March 18 ||  || Disch-Falk Field || 5-7 || 19-3 || –
|- align="center" bgcolor="#ddffdd"
| March 18 || Lamar || Disch-Falk Field || 3-0 || 20-3 || –
|- align="center" bgcolor="ddffdd"
| March 21 || at  || Armstrong Field || 6-0 || 21-3 || 10-0
|- align="center" bgcolor="ddffdd"
| March 22 || at SMU || Armstrong Field || 6-4 || 22-3 || 11-0
|- align="center" bgcolor="ddffdd"
| March 22 || at SMU || Armstrong Field || 5-0 || 23-3 || 12-0
|- align="center" bgcolor="#ffdddd"
| March 24 ||  || Disch-Falk Field || 2-4 || 23-4 || –
|- align="center" bgcolor="#ddffdd"
| March 24 || Minnesota || Disch-Falk Field || 9-3 || 24-4 || –
|- align="center" bgcolor="#ddffdd"
| March 25 || Minnesota || Disch-Falk Field || 6-1 || 25-4 || –
|- align="center" bgcolor="#ddffdd"
| March 25 || Minnesota || Disch-Falk Field || 6-5 || 26-4 || –
|- align="center" bgcolor="ddffdd"
| March 28 ||  || Disch-Falk Field || 6–1 || 27-4 || 13-0
|- align="center" bgcolor="ddffdd"
| March 29 || Arkansas || Disch-Falk Field || 5-1 || 28-4 || 14-0
|- align="center" bgcolor="ddffdd"
| March 29 || Arkansas || Disch-Falk Field || 3-2 || 29-4 || 15-0
|-

|- align="center" bgcolor="ddffdd"
| April 4 || at  || Ferrell Field || 18-6 || 30-4 || 16-0
|- align="center" bgcolor="ddffdd"
| April 5 || at Baylor || Ferrell Field || 9-0 || 31-4 || 17-0
|- align="center" bgcolor="ddffdd"
| April 5 || at Baylor || Ferrell Field || 17-4 || 32-4 || 18-0
|- align="center" bgcolor="#ddffdd"
| April 7 ||  || Disch-Falk Field || 22-4 || 33-4 || –
|- align="center" bgcolor="#ddffdd"
| April 7 ||  || Disch-Falk Field || 10-0 || 34-4 || –
|- align="center" bgcolor="#ddffdd"
| April 8 || SW Louisiana || Disch-Falk Field || 6-2 || 35-4 || –
|- align="center" bgcolor="#ddffdd"
| April 8 || SW Louisiana || Disch-Falk Field || 3-0 || 36-4 || –
|- align="center" bgcolor="ddffdd"
| April 18 ||  || Disch-Falk Field || 6-5 || 37-4 || 19-0
|- align="center" bgcolor="ddffdd"
| April 19 || TCU || Disch-Falk Field || 18-3 || 38-4 || 20-0
|- align="center" bgcolor="ddffdd"
| April 19 || TCU || Disch-Falk Field || 14-0 || 39-4 || 21-0
|- align="center" bgcolor="ddffdd"
| April 25 || at  || Kyle Baseball Field || 15-4 || 40-4 || 22-0
|- align="center" bgcolor="ddffdd"
| April 26 || at Texas A&M || Kyle Baseball Field || 11-1 || 41-4 || 23-0
|- align="center" bgcolor="ffdddd"
| April 26 || at Texas A&M || Kyle Baseball Field || 8-9 || 41-5 || 23-1
|-

|- align="center" bgcolor="ddffdd"
| May 2 || Plano || Disch-Falk Field || 3-0 || 42-5 || -
|- align="center" bgcolor="ddffdd"
| May 2 || Plano || Disch-Falk Field || 5-0 || 43-5 || -
|- align="center" bgcolor="ddffdd"
| May 3 || Plano || Disch-Falk Field || 2-1 || 44-5 || -
|- align="center" bgcolor="ddffdd"
| May 3 || Plano || Disch-Falk Field || 16-0 || 45-5 || -
|- align="center" bgcolor="ddffdd"
| May 15 ||  || Disch-Falk Field || 7-5 || 46-5 || -
|- align="center" bgcolor="ddffdd"
| May 15 || University of Dallas || Disch-Falk Field || 15-1 || 47-5 || -
|- align="center" bgcolor="ddffdd"
| May 16 || University of Dallas || Disch-Falk Field || 2-0 || 48-5 || -
|- align="center" bgcolor="ddffdd"
| May 16 || University of Dallas || Disch-Falk Field || 11-0 || 49-5 || -
|-

|-
! style="background:#BF5700;color:white;"| Post-Season
|-

|- align="center" bgcolor="ddffdd"
| May 22 ||  || Arlington Stadium || 6-2 || 50-5
|- align="center" bgcolor="ddffdd"
| May 24 ||  || Arlington Stadium || 7-4 || 51-5
|- align="center" bgcolor="ddffdd"
| May 25 ||  || Arlington Stadium || 9-2 || 52-5
|-

|- align="center" bgcolor="ddffdd"
| June 6 ||  || Rosenblatt Stadium || 4-2 || 53-5
|- align="center" bgcolor="ffdddd"
| June 8 || Arizona State || Rosenblatt Stadium || 2-5 || 53-6
|- align="center" bgcolor="ddffdd"
| June 9 || Seton Hall || Rosenblatt Stadium || 12-10 || 54-6
|- align="center" bgcolor="ddffdd"
| June 12 || South Carolina || Rosenblatt Stadium || 17-6 || 55-6
|- align="center" bgcolor="ddffdd"
| June 14 || South Carolina || Rosenblatt Stadium || 5-1 || 56-6
|-

Awards and honors 
Rick Bradley
 College World Series All-Tournament Team
 First Team All-SWC

Martin Flores
 First Team All-SWC

Jim Gideon
 Freshamn All-American
 First Team All-SWC

Keith Moreland
 First Team All-American
 First Team All-SWC

Garry Pyka
 First Team All-SWC

Mickey Reichenbach
 College World Series Most Outstanding Player
 First Team All-SWC

Blair Stouffer
 College World Series All-Tournament Team

Rich Wortham
 College World Series All-Tournament Team

Longhorns in the 1975 MLB Draft 
The following members of the Texas Longhorns baseball program were drafted in the 1975 Major League Baseball Draft.

References

External links 
 

Texas Longhorns
Texas Longhorns baseball seasons
College World Series seasons
NCAA Division I Baseball Championship seasons
Southwest Conference baseball champion seasons
Texas Longhorns baseball